The Secretary of Labor is a member of the Virginia Governor's Cabinet. , the office is vacant pending confirmation of Secretary-designate G. Bryan Slater. It was established in 2021.

List of Secretaries of Labor
 Megan Healy (2021–2022)
 G. Bryan Slater (2022-, nominee)

References

External links
 Secretary of Labor

2021 establishments in Virginia
Government agencies established in 2021
Labor
Labor